New Party is a former Greek conservative political party founded in 1947 by Spyros Markezinis. The party was formed after Spyros Markezinis broke away from the People's Party. 18 MPs joined the newformed party, mainly from the People's Party.

In the 1950 Greek legislative election the party elected only one MP, Andreas Stratos. Consequently, in August 1951 the party merged into Greek Rally of Marshal Alexandros Papagos.

References

Conservative parties in Greece
Eastern Orthodox political parties
Political parties established in 1947
1947 establishments in Greece